The Thiruvalluvar Statue, or the Valluvar Statue, is a  stone sculpture of the Tamil poet and philosopher Valluvar, author of the Tirukkural, an ancient Tamil work on Dharma and morality. It is located atop a small island near the town of Kanniyakumari on the southernmost point of the Indian peninsula on the Coromandel Coast, where two seas (the Bay of Bengal and the Arabian Sea) and an ocean (the Indian Ocean) meet. The statue was sculpted by the Indian sculptor V. Ganapati Sthapati, who also created the Iraivan Temple, and was unveiled on the millennium day of 1 January 2000 by the then Chief Minister M. Karunanidhi. It is currently the 25th tallest statue in India.

Description

This includes  sculpture of Valluvar standing upon a  pedestal that represents the 38 chapters of Virtue, the first of the three books of the Kural text. The statue itself represents the second and third books of the Kural text, namely, Wealth and Love. The whole design signifies that wealth and love be earned and enjoyed on the foundation of solid virtue. The right hand of the statue with three fingers pointing skywards signifies the three cantos of the Kural text, namely, Aram, Porul, and Inbam (Virtue, Wealth, and Love, respectively), combined.

The statue, with its slight bend around the waist is reminiscent of a dancing pose of the Hindu deities like Nataraja. The statue weighs .

The monument is regarded as a cultural fusion because of its juxtaposition beside the Vivekananda Rock Memorial. Built-in conformation with traditional Indian architecture, the statue has provision to provide a hollow portion inside from toe to scalp.

Construction

The project was conceived by then Chief Minister M. Karunanidhi in December 1975. On 15 April 1979, the then Prime Minister Morarji Desai laid the foundation stone for the statue, in the presence of the then Chief Minister, M. G. Ramachandran. However, the actual sculpting work, led by Dr. V. Ganapati Sthapathy, former principal of the Government College of Architecture at Mahabalipuram, began a decade later on 6 September 1990, on the tiny island adjacent to the Vivekananda Rock Memorial when funds were allocated in the 199091 budget. 

Sthapathy was chosen for the project over 300 master builders because his suggestion for an all-stone monument to the poet-philosopher prevailed. He observed that stone would be more durable than metal, citing that the Statue of Liberty, which is made of copper, required extensive renovation just a century after its installation. Initially, the project stalled, perhaps owing to Karunanidhi's election loss, but then recommenced in 1997 when he returned to office.

The bend around the waist depicting a dance pose made the design challenging. However, the problem was tackled well in advance by the sculptor by creating a full-length wooden prototype before construction. Study of this prototype led to the identification of an energy line (known in Vastu as kayamadhyasutra), currently an empty cavity in the center of the statue from top to bottom.

The stonework was divided amongst three workshops, in Kanniyakumari, Ambasamudram and Sholinganallur. Stones of such proportions were previously used only in Mayan temples in South America. An interesting detail is a  face, with the ears, nose, eyes, mouth, forehead all made of individual stones carved by hand. The work was done mostly by hand, with each carver wearing down 40 to 50 sharp chisels a day. The sculptors' team considered that the manual method on granite stones is the most dependable since machines may tend to break stones and precision is difficult. Stumps of palmyra tree and poles of casuarina (ironwood) were used for scaffolding. It took 18,000 casuarina poles tied together with two truckloads of ropes to reach the top of the statue. The statue was placed on its pedestal on 19 October 1999.

The statue was unveiled on the millennium day of 1 January 2000. The statue was inaugurated on 1 January 2000 by Dr. M. Karunanidhi, the then chief minister of Tamil Nadu. Besides Indian political leaders and celebrities, foreign delegates including those from Malaysia, Singapore, and Sri Lanka, participated in the opening ceremony. Several Tamil teachers from the state of Tamil Nadu took out a rally from Kottaram to Kanniyakumari carrying Tirukkural placards to mark the ceremony. More than fifty thousand people gathered for the event. The chief minister, after unveiling the statue, called it a "beacon of light to guide human life for all time to come."

The monument was hit by the Indian Ocean tsunami on 26 December 2004 but stood unaffected. The statue is designed to survive earthquakes of unexpected magnitude, such as magnitude 6 on the Richter Scale occurring within . This is far beyond that of any event recorded in the regional history because the bedrock in the region is ancient and without known local faults.

Maintenance
To prevent the statue from corrosion due to sea breeze, the statue is chemically treated once in four years. The salty deposits in every joint are removed and replaced with new cement mixture. Paper pulp is then applied on the whole of the statue. As the paper pulp coating dries, it absorbs the salty deposits completely, after which it is removed.

The statue has been thus treated three times since its unveiling. The fourth treatment began on 17 April 2017 and was completed by 15 October 2017.

Access
The statue stands  from the coastline of Kanniyakumari on a small island rock. Ferry service are available from the mainland. The ferry service to Vivekananda Rock Memorial stops for a while at the Valluvar Statue.

The Vivekananda Kendra has a proposal to connect the Valluvar memorial with the Vivekananda rock memorial by bridge to enable visitors to move easily from one island to the other.

Gallery

See also
 Tirukkural
 List of tallest statues

References

External links

 The Tribune
 Thiruvalluvar statue and other visiting places in Kanniyakumari

Colossal statues in India
Monuments and memorials in Tamil Nadu
Memorials to Valluvar
Kanyakumari
Coromandel Coast
Buildings and structures in Tamil Nadu
2000 sculptures
Buildings and structures completed in 2000
Tourist attractions in Tamil Nadu
Statues of writers
Tirukkural
2000 establishments in Tamil Nadu